Khomasdal is a suburb of Namibia's capital of Windhoek in the Khomas Region. Founded as Windhoek's residential area for Coloured people, Khomasdal still is primarily composed of Coloured people. 

In October 2006, the City of Windhoek announced the construction of an informal market in Khomasdal. The market will give the Khomasdal community the opportunity to generate their own income and even create more jobs in the process. Since then the Market has been finished and is situated on the corner of Mahatma Gandhi and Hans-Dietrich Genscher streets in Khomasdal. 
 A similar SME Market can also be found in Katutura.

Khomasdal is also home to the Windhoek College of Education, one of four national colleges of education.

Notable people from Khomasdal
 Zenobia Kloppers, actress
 Ricardo Manetti, head coach of the Brave Warriors
 Robbie Savage, official mascot of the Brave Warriors

References

Suburbs of Windhoek